Elisa Hope Spitz-Iuliano (born May 17, 1963 in Short Hills, New Jersey) is an American former figure skater. She competed in ice dance at the 1984 Winter Olympics with Scott Gregory. Elisa is the mother of two sons, Joe Iuliano and Mike Iuliano. Elisa's eldest son Joe is a former NCAA Div. I Football player at Morehead State University. Mike is currently a musician featuring in songs alongside DJ4B, Kyle Woodcock, and many other well-known artists in the industry. Mike's stagename is DJ M.I and is a member of Secret Sauce.

Results
(with Scott Gregory)

References

American female ice dancers
Olympic figure skaters of the United States
Figure skaters at the 1984 Winter Olympics
Sportspeople from Essex County, New Jersey
1963 births
Living people
People from Millburn, New Jersey
21st-century American women